Thomas David Nicholls (September 16, 1870 – January 19, 1931) was an Independent Democratic member of the U.S. House of Representatives from Pennsylvania.

Thomas D. Nicholls was born in Wilkes-Barre, Pennsylvania.  He moved to Nanticoke, Pennsylvania, with his parents.  He worked in mines as a boy.  He studied mining by correspondence and passed a state examination in 1897, received a mine foreman's certificate of competency, and was appointed superintendent of mines.  He was district president of District No. 1 of the United Mine Workers of America, from 1899 to 1909, resigning on account of ill health.

Nicholls was elected as an Independent Democrat to the Sixtieth and Sixty-first Congresses.  He was not a candidate for renomination in 1910.  He moved to a farm in Somerset County, Maryland, near Princess Anne, in 1911 and engaged in the raising of poultry.  He died in Princess Anne in 1931.  Interment in Antioch Methodist Episcopal Cemetery.

Sources

The Political Graveyard

1870 births
1931 deaths
Members of the United States House of Representatives from Pennsylvania
People from the Scranton–Wilkes-Barre metropolitan area
United Mine Workers people
Pennsylvania Democrats
Pennsylvania Independents
Independent Democrat members of the United States House of Representatives